Taekwondo is an Olympic sport that is contested at the Summer Olympic Games. It was introduced in the 1988 and 1992 Olympic Games as a demonstration sport, and made its debut as a full medal sport at the 2000 Summer Olympics in Sydney, Australia. Both men and women compete in four events each defined by separate weight classes: flyweight, featherweight, middleweight and heavyweight. Traditionally, taekwondo competitions consist of eight weight classes for each gender, but Olympic taekwondo only has four due to the International Olympic Committee (IOC) limiting the total number of taekwondo entrants to 128.

The competitions are conducted in accordance with the rules established by the World Taekwondo (WT). The competition format for taekwondo is a single-elimination tournament to determine the gold and silver medal winners, and a repechage is used to determine the bronze medal winner(s). in 2000 and 2004, a single repechage final determined the sole bronze medal winner, but a rule change in 2008 created two repechage finals that allowed for the bronze medal to be shared between two competitors.

Iranian Hadi Saei (2 gold, 1 bronze), American Steven López (2 gold, 1 bronze), South Korean Hwang Kyung-Seon (2 gold, 1 bronze) and Mexican María del Rosario Espinoza (1 gold, 1 silver, 1 bronze) share the most medals in Taekwondo with three. By defending her title at 2012 London Olympics, Hwang Kyung-Seon became the first woman ever to win three Olympic taekwondo medals. Hadi Saei and Steven López, along with Huang Chih-hsiung of Chinese Taipei, are the only three athletes to have won medals in multiple weight classes. Spanish Adriana Cerezo is the youngest athlete to win a medal (17 years, 242 days) and Hadi Saei is the oldest (32 years, 2 months, 13 days). Rohullah Nikpai of Afghanistan became his country's first ever Olympic medalist with a bronze medal in 2008. South Korea has been the most successful nation in Olympic taekwondo, winning 22 medals (12 gold, 3 silver, 7 bronze). China is the second most successful nation with 11 medals (7 gold, 1 silver, 3 bronze). A total of 32 gold medals, 32 silver medals and 48 bronze medals have been awarded since 2000 and have been won by athletes from 33 National Olympic Committees (NOC).



Men

Flyweight (58 kg)

Featherweight (68 kg)

Middleweight (80 kg)

Heavyweight (+80 kg)

Women

Flyweight (49 kg)

Featherweight (57 kg)

Middleweight (67 kg)

Heavyweight (+67 kg)

Statistics

Athlete medal leaders
Athletes who won at least two medals are listed below.

 The years indicate the Olympics at which the medals were won.

Medals per year

See also
World Taekwondo Championships
World Cup Taekwondo Team Championships
Lists of Olympic medalists

References
General
 
 2000 2004 2008
 
Specific

Taekwondo
Taekwondo at the Summer Olympics

Lists of taekwondo practitioners